Mahinda may refer to:

People
Mahinda Rajapaksa, former Sri Lankan President
Mahinda Amaraweera, Sri Lankan politician
Mahinda Samarasinghe, Sri Lankan politician
Mahinda Ratnatilaka, Sri Lankan politician
Mahinda Wijesekara, Sri Lankan politician
Mahinda Yapa Abeywardena, Sri Lankan politician
Mahinda V of Anuradhapura, Sri Lankan king
Mahindananda Aluthgamage, Sri Lankan politician
Mahinda (Buddhist monk) (3rd Century BCE), Buddhist monk who introduced the Pali Canon to Sri Lanka
S. Mahinda (1901-1951), Theravada Buddhist monk born in Sikkim

Other uses
Mahinda (species), a genus of wasp in Amiseginae subfamilia, Chrysididae familia
Mahinda College, a Buddhist boys' school in Galle